Alvah Jackson Cochran (January 31, 1891 – May 23, 1947) was a professional baseball pitcher who played in one game for the Cincinnati Reds on August 25, .

External links

1891 births
1947 deaths
Cincinnati Reds players
Major League Baseball pitchers
Baseball players from Georgia (U.S. state)
Norfolk Tars players